Bush lupin or bush lupine is a common name applied to a number of shrubby species of lupin:

Lupinus albifrons Silver bush lupine
Lupinus arboreus Yellow bush lupine
Lupinus chamissonis Chamisso bush lupine 
Lupinus excubitus Grape soda lupine 
Lupinus longifolius Longleaf bush lupine

Lupinus